Swiss Democracy (SD) is a Czech political movement whose main goal is to introduce a Swiss system of state governance and follow a conservative policy modeled on Switzerland. The party in its current form was founded in February 2021 and has roots in a local movement in Uherské Hradiště called Healthy Hradiště. The party contested the 2021 Czech legislative election and obtained 16,822 votes.

Election results

Chamber of Deputies

References 

Political parties established in 2021
Political parties in the Czech Republic
2021 establishments in the Czech Republic